Edward Goff Penny (4 September 1858 – 1 October 1935) was a Canadian politician. He was elected as a Member of Parliament in 1896 for the riding of St. Lawrence. He served until 1900 and did not run for re-election.

External links
 

1858 births
1935 deaths
Liberal Party of Canada MPs
Members of the House of Commons of Canada from Quebec
Politicians from Montreal